Rincón also known as El Rincón is a small hamlet in Camajuaní, Villa Clara, Cuba. Nearby towns are Vega Alta, Canoa, Benito Ramírez, La Luz, Guerrero, El Perico, and Chicharón. It’s sea level is 101 meters.

The Saint Lazarus sanctuary is located in Rincón where many Cubans make an annual pilgrimage on December 17 to mark the feast day of San Lázaro.

In culture
Rincón is Recounted in:
 BOHEMIA Edición De La LIBERTAD, book written around 1959

See also 
Luis Arcos Bergnes, Cuba
La Quinta, Cuba
Aguada de Moya, Cuba

References 

Populated places in Villa Clara Province